Inositol polyphosphate-5-phosphatase F is a protein that in humans is encoded by the INPP5F gene.

Function

The protein encoded by this gene is an inositol 1,4,5-trisphosphate (InsP3) 5-phosphatase and contains a Sac domain. The activity of this protein is specific for phosphatidylinositol 4,5-bisphosphate and phosphatidylinositol 3,4,5-trisphosphate. Alternatively spliced transcript variants encoding multiple isoforms have been observed for this gene. [provided by RefSeq, Aug 2011].

References

Further reading